Roman Polák (born 28 April 1986) is a Czech professional ice hockey defenceman who is currently under contract with HC Vítkovice of the Czech Extraliga (ELH). Polák was drafted in the sixth round, 180th overall, at the 2004 NHL Entry Draft by the St. Louis Blues, the organization with which he spent his entire NHL career prior to joining the Toronto Maple Leafs in 2014. He rejoined the Maple Leafs in 2016, after a brief stint with the San Jose Sharks. In the 2018 offseason, Polák signed a one-year deal with the Dallas Stars.

Playing career
Polák was drafted in the sixth round, 180th overall, in the 2004 NHL Entry Draft by the St. Louis Blues. After playing in the Western Hockey League (WHL) in the 2004–05 season with the Kootenay Ice, he returned to his native Czech Republic to make his professional debut with HC Vítkovice of the Czech Extraliga.

In the 2006–07 season, Polák returned to North America and appeared in his first NHL game on 9 October 2006, against the Anaheim Ducks. After two seasons between the Blues and their affiliate, the Peoria Rivermen, Polák made the starting roster for the Blues in the 2008–09 season.

Polák scored his first NHL goal in his 57th game on 20 December 2008, against the Minnesota Wild. He finished the season with 15 points in 69 games and was re-signed by the Blues to a two-year contract on 24 July 2009.
Emerging as a mainstay in the Blues defense and establishing himself as one of the Blues' top defensive-defensemen over the next two seasons, Polák was re-signed by St. Louis to a five-year contract extension on 2 June 2011.

On 28 June 2014, Polák was traded to the Toronto Maple Leafs in exchange for defenseman Carl Gunnarsson and a 2014 fourth-round draft pick (Ville Husso). During his first season in Toronto, Polák set a career-high in goals scored (5).

On 22 February 2016, Polák was traded to the San Jose Sharks along with Nick Spaling in exchange for second-round draft picks in 2017 and 2018, as well as forward Raffi Torres. He was part of a Sharks team that made their first appearance in the Stanley Cup Final, but came up short to the Pittsburgh Penguins, losing 4 games to 2.

On 2 July 2016, Polák returned to the Maple Leafs on a one-year contract. Many considered it a strategic signing, with the rebuilding team anticipated to once again trade Polák for assets at the trade deadline. However the Maple Leafs exceeded expectations and found themselves within the playoff race come trade deadline, leading to Polák remaining with the team in a bid to make the post-season. On 23 March 2017, Polák was suspended for the first time in his career for two games as the result of a hit from behind on Columbus Blue Jackets forward Oliver Bjorkstrand a few nights earlier. Once he returned, Polák assisted the Maple Leafs in clinching a playoff spot; the first time the team has achieved the feat in a full season since 2004. In game two of the first round vs the Washington Capitals, he was the victim of a knee on knee hit from defenceman Brooks Orpik, which resulted in Polák sustaining a lower body injury that sidelined him for the remainder of the post-season.

On 14 September 2017, Polák signed a professional tryout contract with the hopes to continue with the Toronto Maple Leafs. He began the 2017–18 as a free agent but remained training with the Maple Leafs. On 22 October 2017, Polák signed a one-year, $1.1 million contract for his fourth season with the Maple Leafs.

On 1 July 2018, Polák signed a one-year, $1.3 million contract with the Dallas Stars. In the 2018–19 season, Polák added a physical presence to the Stars third pairing on the blueline. In 77 games he registered 1 goal and 9 points. In the post-season, Polák had one assist in 13 games to help the Stars advance to the Western Conference Second Round, which they lost in seven games to former club, the St. Louis Blues.

On 6 June 2019, Polák opted to continue his tenure in Dallas, agreeing to a one-year $1.75 million extension. In the 2019–20 season, Polák added veteran depth experience to the Stars' blueline, adding 4 assists through 41 games before the season was suspended due to COVID-19. During the NHL's hiatus, Polák agreed to a three-year contract to return to his native Czech Republic with original club, HC Vítkovice, beginning from the 2020–21 season on 15 June 2020. On 11 July 2020, Polák was not selected on the Stars' training camp roster, opting out in the NHL's Return to Play scheme.

Career statistics

Regular season and playoffs

International

References

External links
 

1986 births
Czech expatriate ice hockey players in Canada
Czech expatriate ice hockey players in the United States
Czech ice hockey defencemen
Dallas Stars players
Ice hockey players at the 2010 Winter Olympics
Kootenay Ice players
Living people
Olympic ice hockey players of the Czech Republic
Peoria Rivermen (AHL) players
Sportspeople from Ostrava
St. Louis Blues draft picks
St. Louis Blues players
San Jose Sharks players
Toronto Maple Leafs players
HC Vítkovice players